HMS Assurance was a 32-gun fourth-rate of the English Navy, built by Peter Pett I at Deptford Dockyard and launched in 1646. She was in the Parliamentary force during the English Civil War, then the Commonwealth Navy and was incorporated into the Royal Navy after the Restoration in 1660. During her time in the Commonwealth Navy she partook in the Battles of Dover, Portland, Gabbard and Texel. She foundered in a gale at Woolwich in 1660 and was salved. After the Restoration she partook in the Battle of Lowestoffe, the Four Days Fight and the Texel (1673). She was reduced to a Fifth Rate in 1690 before being sold in 1698.

Assurance was the second named vessel since it was used for a 48-gun galleon named Hope launched at Deptford in 1559, rebuilt and renamed Assurance in 1604 and broken in 1645.

Construction and specifications
She was ordered in December 1645 from Deptford Dockyard to be built under the supervision of Master Shipwright Peter Pett I. She was launched in 1646. The tonnage calculation would be  tons.

Her armament varied during her time as a fourth rate. When she was launched she had 32 guns of various calibres. In 1666 she carried 38 guns: ten culverins, twenty-four demi-culverins and four sakers. In 1677 her gun armament was 42 guns in wartime and 38 guns in peacetime. Her armament consisted of twenty demi-culverins, eighteen 6-pounder guns and four sakers. In 1685 her armament was 42 guns consisting of ten culverins, twelve demi-culverins, sixteen 6-pounder guns and four 3-pounder guns. She was completed with an initial cost of £2,352 or 336 tons @ £7 per ton.

Commissioned service

Service in the English Civil War
She was commissioned in 1646 for service with the Parliamentary forces under Captain William Penn for service in the Winter Guard through 1647. She was in the Irish Sea  in 1647 thru 1649.

Service in the Commonwealth Navy
In 1650 she was under the command of Captain Benjamin Blake with Robert Blake's Fleet at Tagus. She took a 28-gun Portuguese frigate in single combat in October 1650. She returned home in 1650. She again was under Captain Penn in the Mediterranean in 1651. At the Battle of Dover she was a member of Rear-Admiral Nehemiah Bourne's Squadron of nine ships on 19 May 1652. This battle is sometimes recorded as the 'Battle of Goodwin Sands. At the Battle of Kentish Knock she was a member of Robert Blake's Fleet of sixty-eight ships on 28 September 1652. Then she was under Captain Robert Sanders at the Battle of Portland. At the Battle off Portland she was a member of Robert Blake's Fleet of eighty-four ships from 18 to 20 February 1653. This British victory secured control over the English Channel. The Dutch lost eight warships and forty merchant vessels. Later in 1653 Captain Philip Holland took command. She partook in the Battle of Gabbard as a member of White Squadron, Rear Division under the command of Rear-Admiral Thomas Graves, on 2/3 June 1653. The British were victorious on the first day. When Admiral Tromp attempted to reattack on the 3rd he withdrew when a squadron of eighteen ships arrived under the command of Robert Blake. This fight was followed by the Battle of Scheveningen where she was a member of White Squadron, Rear Division under the command of Rear-Admiral Thomas Graves on 31 July 1653. She was off the Dutch coast for the winter of 1653/54. She joined Robert Blake's Fleet in the Mediterranean in August 1655 remaining with him until July 1656, when she returned home for service in the English Channel. She partook in operations in the Sound in 1659. In late 1660 Captain John Stakes took command. She founder at Woolwich on 9 December 1660 with the loss of 20 of her crew. Samuel Pepys states in his diary that Assurance sank near Woolwich during a storm in December 1660, with the loss of twenty men. He visited the site a few days later. The ship was subsequently refloated by 17 December.

Service after the Restoration 1661
On 4 May 1661 she was under the command of John Tyrwhitt, RN and was with the Earl of Sandwich's squadron at Tangiers, then Algiers on 31 July. She was with Lawson's squadron in the Mediterranean later in the year. On 7 September 1664 she was under command of Captain John Jeffereys. She partook in the Battle of Lowestoffe as a member of White Squadron, Center Division under the command of Prince Rupert, on 3 June 1665. On 18 June she was under Captain Philmon Bacon, RN. She was in action on 3/4 September 1665 and captured the 50-gun Westfriesland. On 18 September 1665 she was under the command of Captain Thomas Guy, RN. She participated in the Battle of the Galloper Sand (also known as the Four Days Battle) in Prince Rupert's Squadron, Van Division on 4 June 1666 losing 3 killed with 4 wounded.

Captain John Narborough took command on 11 June 1666. She was at the Battle of Oxfordness as a member of White Squadron, Center Division under the command of Admiral Sir Thomas Allin, on 25 July 1666. She was also present in the attack on Dutch shipping in the Vile (also known as Holmes Bonfire) on 9/10 August 1666. In June 1667 she sailed for the West Indies with Rear Admiral John Harmon's Squadron for Martinique. She was in action there on 24/25 June before returning to Home Waters. The 30 October 1667 saw Captain Nepthali Ball. RN take command. 13 July 1670 her new commander was Captain Charles Wylde, RN and on 10 December  Captain William Beeston, RN had command. Captain Ralph Lassells, RN took command on 15 May 1672. She was at the battles of Schooneveld as part of Red Squadron, Rear Division first on 28 May and then 4 June 1673. She was at the Battle of Texel on 11 August 1673. Captain Henry Williams, RN took command on 5 September 1673. Captain Sir Robert Robinson, RN took command on 1 May 1676 for service in the Mediterranean. She moved to the English Channel under Captain Thomas Lovell, RN who took command on 14 May 1678 for service in the English Channel. On 19 May 1680 she was under Captain Stephen Akerman and sailed for Newfoundland, then later was in the Soundings and finally with the Herring convoy in 1682/83.24 May 1688 saw Captain Randall M'Donald, RN in Command with Dartmouth's Fleet. Captain M'Donald was dismissed on 13 December 1688. In 1689 she was under command of Captai Simon Foulkes off Dunkirk. In 1690 Captain John Mayne was her commander with the Fleet. Also in 1690 she was reduced to a Fifth Rate. In 1691 Captain Isaac Townsend, RN took command and sailed to Virginia in 1692. Captain John Price, RN followed by Captain William Fazeby, RN were her commanders as she served as guardship at Sheerness.

Disposition
HMS Assurance was sold in 1698.

Notes

Citations

References

 Winfield, British Warships in the Age of Sail (1603 – 1714), by Rif Winfield, published by Seaforth Publishing, England © 2009, EPUB 
 Fleet Actions
 1.1 Battle off Dover 19 May 1652
 1.3 Battle of Kentish Knock 28 September 1652
 1.5 Battle off Portland (the 'Three Days Battle') 18–20 February 1653
 1.7 Battle of the Gabbard (North Foreland) 2–3 June 1653
 1.8 Battle of Scheveningen (off Texel) 31 July 1653
 3.1 Battle of Lowestoffe 3 June 1665
 3.3 Battle of Galloper Sand ('the four Days Battle) 1–4 June 1666
 3.4 Battle of Oxfordness ('the St James Day Battle') 25–6 July 1666
 3.5 Attack on the River Vile ('Sir Robert Holmes Bonfire') 9–10 August 1666
 3.8 Battle of Martinique 24/25 June 1667
 5.3 First Battle of Schooneveld 28 May and 5.4 Second on 4 June 1673
 5.5 Battle of Texel 11 August 1673
 Chapter 4, The Fourth Rates - 'Small Ships', Vessels acquired from 24 March 1603, 1646 Programme, Assurance
 Colledge, Ships of the Royal Navy, by J.J. Colledge, revised and updated by Lt Cdr Ben Warlow and Steve Bush, published by Seaforth Publishing, Barnsley, Great Britain, © 2020, EPUB , (EPUB), Section A (Assurance), Section H (Hope)
 Lavery, The Arming and Fitting of English Ships of War 1800 - 1815, by Brian Lavery, published by US Naval Institute Press (C) 1989, 

Ships of the line of the Royal Navy
Ships built in Deptford
1640s ships